The year 2020 was the 3rd year in the history of the Bare Knuckle Fighting Championship, a bare-knuckle fighting promotion based in Philadelphia.

Background 
2020 season started with Bare Knuckle Fighting Championship 10: Lombard vs. Riggs. BKFC is available on PPV all over the world and on FITE TV.

Super Welterweight Championship Tournament Bracket 

 Alers withdrew from the final and was replaced by Vallie-Flagg.

List of events

Bare Knuckle Fighting Championship 10: Lombard vs. Mundell

Bare Knuckle Fighting Championship 10: Lombard vs. Mundell was a bare-knuckle fighting event held by Bare Knuckle Fighting Championship on February 15, 2020 at the Broward County Convention Center in Fort Lauderdale, USA.

Background
Joe Riggs was scheduled to face Héctor Lombard in the main event, however Riggs suffered an injury in training and withdrew from the fight. David Mundell served as Riggs replacement, taking the short notice fight against Lombard.

This event also featured the first two quarter-final bouts of the Tournament to crown the first BKFC Super welterweight Championship.

Bonus awards

The following fighters were awarded bonuses:
 Fight of the Night: Jim Alers vs. Kaleb Harris

Results

Bare Knuckle Fighting Championship 11: Palomino vs. Vallie-Flagg

Bare Knuckle Fighting Championship 11: Palomino vs. Vallie-Flagg was a bare-knuckle fighting event held by Bare Knuckle Fighting Championship on July 24, 2020 at the Lafayette County Multipurpose Arena in Oxford, Mississippi, USA.

Background
The event was initially scheduled to be held on March 14, 2020 at the Intrust Bank Arena in Wichita, USA. However, the event was postponed until June 20, 2020 due to the COVID-19 pandemic. It was then pushed back further to July 24, 2020 and moved to the Lafayette County Arena in Oxford, Mississippi

Results

Bare Knuckle Fighting Championship 12: Alves vs. Lane

Bare Knuckle Fighting Championship 12: Alves vs. Lane was a bare-knuckle fighting event held by Bare Knuckle Fighting Championship on September 11, 2020 at the Ocean Center in Daytona Beach, Florida.

Background
The event was initially scheduled to be held on April 11, 2020 at the Boutwell Memorial Auditorium in Birmingham, USA. However, the event was postponed indefinitely due to the COVID-19 pandemic. It was later rescheduled to take place on August 21, 2020, at the Intrust Bank Arena in Wichita, Kansas. However, it was then pushed back further to September 11, 2020 and moved to the Ocean Center convention center in Daytona Beach, Florida, USA. 

Thiago Alves was originally scheduled to face Phil Baroni in the main event. However, on September 3, it was announced Baroni would be replaced by The Ultimate Fighter competitor Julian Lane.

Bonus awards

The following fighters were awarded bonuses:
 Fight of the Night: Joe Elmore vs. Tom Shoaff

Results

Bare Knuckle Fighting Championship 13: Beltran vs. Stamps

Bare Knuckle Fighting Championship 13: Beltran vs. Stamps was a bare-knuckle fighting event held by Bare Knuckle Fighting Championship on October 10, 2020 at the Tony's Pizza Events Center in Salina, Kansas, USA.

Background
The event was headlined by Joey Beltran defending his BKFC Heavyweight Championship against Marcel Stamps.

Results

Bare Knuckle Fighting Championship 14: Palomino vs. Alers

Bare Knuckle Fighting Championship 14: Palomino vs. Alers was a bare-knuckle fighting event held by Bare Knuckle Fighting Championship on November 13, 2020 at the InterContinental Miami in Miami, Florida.

Background
The event was expected to be headlined by recent signee Paige VanZant. However, the fight never materialized. 

Instead, the card was headlined by Luis Palomino defending the BKFC Super Welterweight Championship against Jim Alers.

Results

Bare Knuckle Fighting Championship 15: Shewmaker vs. O'Bannon

'Bare Knuckle Fighting Championship 15: Shewmaker vs. O'Bannon' was a bare-knuckle boxing event held by Bare Knuckle Fighting Championship on December 11, 2020 at the Mississippi Coast Coliseum in Biloxi, Mississippi, USA.

Background
The promotion was targeting a Heavyweight bout between MMA veterant Mark Godbeer and Sam Shewmaker to headline the event. However, it was announced on December 6 that Godbeer was pulled from the contest after he tested positive for COVID-19.  Undefeated heavyweight Bobo O'Bannon stepped up on a few days' notice to fight Shewmaker in the main-event.

Results

See also 
Bare Knuckle Fighting Championship

References

External links
   Bare Knuckle Official Website

Bare Knuckle Fighting Championship
2020 in boxing
2020 sport-related lists